Gary Bukowski is an Australian former professional rugby league footballer who played in the 1980s and 1990s. He played for Western Suburbs in the NSWRL competition. Bukowski also played for Southern Suburbs in the Brisbane Rugby League premiership.

Playing career
Bukowski began his career with Southern Suburbs in the Brisbane Rugby League premiership making two appearances in 1987. In 1988, Bukowski signed for Western Suburbs and made 31 appearances for the club over four years.

References

1966 births
Western Suburbs Magpies players
Souths Logan Magpies players
Australian rugby league players
Rugby league second-rows
Rugby league props
Living people